The Imagineering Story is a 2019 documentary streaming television miniseries created, directed and executive produced by Leslie Iwerks. The series is focused on Walt Disney Imagineering and takes an in-depth look at the history and creation of the Disney theme parks and attractions around the world. The series premiered on Disney+ at the launch date of November 12, 2019.

Production 
Originally announced as a feature documentary in 2013, The Walt Disney Company CEO Bob Iger announced that the film was being revamped as a series of six one-hour episodes for the upcoming Disney+ streaming service. In April 2019, the series was formally announced. In August 2019, it was announced that Angela Bassett will be narrating the series.

Episodes

Release
The Imagineering Story  premiered on November 12, 2019, on Disney+, in the United States and in the United Kingdom on March 24, 2020.

A supplemental book based on the series written by Iwerks entitled The Imagineering Story: The Official Biography of Walt Disney Imagineering was published by Disney Editions on November 8, 2022.

Reception

Critical reception 
The review aggregator website Rotten Tomatoes reported a 100% approval rating for the series with an average rating of 6.84/10, based on 13 reviews. Metacritic, which uses a weighted average, assigned a score of 62 out of 100 based on 7 critics, indicating "generally favorable reviews".

Joel Keller of Decider praised the series for depicting the construction and development of Walt Disney World in Florida, and the achievements of Disney employees working at Walt Disney Imagineering, but claimed that the documentary could have been more lively. Melissa Camacho of Common Sense Media rated the documentary 3 out of 5 stars, stating: "The Imagineering Story is a documentary series about the creative teams that conceptualize, design, and build Disney theme parks and their best attractions. It highlights the importance of pushing boundaries and being creative, and the role of STEAM principles in this process." Gretchen Smail of IGN rated the series 6,5 out of 10, praised the documentary and found it interesting for providing information and anecdotes on the history of Disney parks, stated that the series forms a tribute to the people who created and worked on Disney's parks and attractions that highlights their innovative contributions, but claimed that the documentary does not engage with the history of The Walt Disney Company with enough balance.

Accolades

References

External links 

 
 

2010s American documentary television series
2019 American television series debuts
2019 American television series endings
Disney+ original programming
Documentary television series about industry
English-language television shows
Television series by Disney
Works about Disney